Bujar Hoxha (unknown – unknown) was an Albanian chess player, two-time Albanian Chess Championship winner.

Biography
In the 1950s Bujar Hoxha was one of Albania's leading chess players. He twice won Albanian Chess Championship: in 1951, 1952 (together with Ylvi Pustina). In 1954, Bujar Hoxha represented Albania in World Chess Championship Zonal Tournament. In this tournament, he finished last, gaining 2 points out of 19 possible, played draw with Gideon Ståhlberg, Eigil Pedersen, Victor Ciocâltea and Ilmari Solin.

Bujar Hoxha played for Albania in the Chess Olympiad:
 In 1960, at second board in the 14th Chess Olympiad in Leipzig (+3, =8, -5).

Bujar Hoxha played for Albania in the Men's Chess Balkaniad:
 In 1946, at second board in the 1st Men's Chess Balkaniad in Belgrade (+0, =0, -3).

References

External links

Bujar Hoxha chess games at 365chess.com

Year of birth missing
Year of death missing
Albanian chess players
Chess Olympiad competitors
20th-century chess players